Hebron High School may refer to:

Hebron High School (Ahmedabad), Ahmedabad, India
Hebron High School (Texas), Carrollton, Texas
Hebron High School (Indiana), Hebron, Indiana
Mount Hebron High School, Ellicott City, Maryland